is the sixth single from Aya Matsuura, who was a Hello! Project solo artist at the time. It was released on May 29, 2002 under the Zetima label. Tsunku composed and wrote the lyrics, and it was arranged by Yuichi Takahashi. The song appears in 2012 Japanese game, Just Dance Wii 2

Track listing 
  – 3:50
  – 4:38
 "Yeah! Meccha Holiday" (Instrumental) – 3:46

Covers by other artists 
The title song was covered by AKB48's Rino Sashihara on her debut solo single "Soredemo Suki Da yo".

External links 
 Yeah! Meccha Holiday entry on the Up-Front Works official website

Aya Matsuura songs
Zetima Records singles
2002 singles
Japanese-language songs
Songs written by Tsunku
Song recordings produced by Tsunku
2002 songs
Dance-pop songs